Anthrenus (Anthrenus) oceanicus, is a species of skin beetle native to Hawaii, India, China, Indonesia (Java, Madura, Malaysia), Sri Lanka, New Caledonia and Mauritius. It is introduced to Egypt, French Polynesia, Czech Republic and England particularly with commodities.

Description
Body length is about 2.5 to 2.25 mm. First abdominal sternite is without a black lateral spot. The elytral transverse band is white and broad.

Relationship to humans
This species can seriously damage carpets and other woollen goods in stores.

References 

Dermestidae
Beetles of Asia
Beetles of Oceania
Insects of Sri Lanka
Pest insects
Beetles described in 1903
Taxa named by Charles Adolphe Albert Fauvel